Chimène Badi (born 30 October 1982 in Melun, Seine-et-Marne), also known by her mononym Chimène, is a French singer of Algerian descent.

Early life
Badi was born in Melun in the Paris suburbs to a family of Algerian origin. She spent her entire childhood in the south-west of France. She grew up in Villeneuve-sur-Lot with her parents, Chérifa and Mohammed, her sister, Déborah, and her brother, Karim. Her sister Déborah encouraged her to persevere with her singing and Chimène went on to hone her vocal style still further, performing at family parties and regional song contests from the age of six.

Badi also made her mark at her school's end-of-year shows, wowing the audience with her confident vocal performance. Teachers barely recognised her since, when she was off stage, Badi was a notoriously shy pupil, given to daydreaming and complexes about her appearance. Meanwhile, she plugged away at her studies, going on to obtain a "BEP" in agribusiness.

Musical career
Badi did not win the French reality TV show, Popstars, but she released her first single "Entre Nous" in 2003, which reached number 1 in the French charts. An album of the same name reached number 4 in domestic charts, and became the fifth best selling French album of 2003.

Badi's follow-up albums and singles enjoyed moderate success in Francophone Europe, including Wallonia and Switzerland. She also provided the French language theme song to the film The Day After Tomorrow – "Le Jour d'après" (The Day After). She worked with producer Guy Roche (Tout Contre Toi) and songwriter Diane Warren (Tellement Beau).

In 2011, Badi covered the soul classic "Ain't No Mountain High Enough" with American singer Billy Paul. She participated in the 2019 edition of Destination Eurovision to attempt to represent France at the Eurovision Song Contest 2019 in Tel Aviv, Israel, with the song "Là-haut". She placed third overall in the final.

Other 
In 2012, she was one of the contestants during the Third season of Danse avec les stars.

Discography

Albums

1 French Digital Charts

Singles 

1 French Digital Charts

Musical

Notes

External links
 Official site at Universal Music France (in French)
 Biography at Radio France Internationale (in English)
 

1982 births
Living people
People from Melun
French feminists
Feminist musicians
French people of Algerian descent
21st-century French singers
21st-century French women singers